The 1986 Minnesota Twins  finished at 71–91, sixth in the AL West, 21 games behind the eventual AL runner-up California Angels. 1,255,453 fans attended Twins games, the second lowest total in the American League. Pitcher Bert Blyleven made a prediction on Fan Appreciation Day on October 3, saying that if the team came together as a unit and signed some other good players, they could potentially bring a World Series championship to Minnesota. That prediction proved accurate the next year.

Offseason
 December 20, 1985: Rick Lysander was released by the Twins.
 January 7, 1986: Ken Schrom and Bryan Oelkers were traded by the Twins to the Cleveland Indians for Roy Smith and Ramón Romero.
 January 14, 1986: Jarvis Brown was drafted by the Twins in the 1st round (9th pick) of the 1986 Major League Baseball draft. Player signed May 23, 1986.
 January 16, 1986: Tim Teufel and Pat Crosby (minors) were traded by the Twins to the New York Mets for Billy Beane, Joe Klink and Bill Latham.
 January 16, 1986: Dave Engel was traded by the Minnesota Twins to the Detroit Tigers for Chris Pittaro and Alejandro Sánchez.
 March 31, 1986: Mike Hart was traded by the Twins to the Baltimore Orioles for Ben Bianchi (minors), Steve Padia (minors), and a player to be named later. The Orioles completed the deal by sending Jeff Hubbard (minors) to the Twins on April 23.

Regular season

On May 30, Roy Smalley Jr. homered from both sides of the plate, the first Twin to do so.

Only one Twins player made the All-Star Game: outfielder Kirby Puckett.

On August 1, Puckett hit for the cycle, the only time he'd do so in his major league career.  Going triple, double, single, homer, he became the seventh Twin in history to cycle.  On the same night, pitcher Bert Blyleven struck out Oakland's Mike Davis to notch his 3000th strikeout.  Only eight other pitchers had reached that plateau.

After a disappointing start, manager Ray Miller was replaced by Tom Kelly on September 12.

Greg Gagne of the Twins hit two inside-the-park home runs in one game on October 4, against the Chicago White Sox. Pitcher Bert Blyleven was on the mound for the Twins; the last time a batter had hit two inside-the-park homers in one game, it was Dick Allen of the White Sox on July 31, 1972, and his homers were hit off Blyleven.

Also on October 4, Blyleven allowed his 50th home run of the season (to Chicago's Daryl Boston) to set a major league record.  (When he served up 46 in 1987, he set another record with 96 homers allowed over consecutive seasons.)

Offense
Kirby Puckett switched from leadoff to third in the batting order, blasted 31 HR, drove in 96 runs and scored 119.
Kent Hrbek hit .267 with 29 HR and 91 RBI.
Tom Brunansky hit 23 HR and 75 RBI.
Gary Gaetti hit .287 with 34 HR and 108 RBI.
With Roy Smalley Jr.'s 20 home runs, five players reached 20 homers this season, the first time that happened since six players topped 20 in 1964.

Pitching
The Twins had three solid starting pitchers: Frank Viola (16-13), 
Bert Blyleven (17-14), and Mike Smithson (13-14). Reliever Keith Atherton had 10 saves.

Defense
Third baseman Gary Gaetti and center fielder Kirby Puckett each won their first Gold Glove Award. They were the first Twins to win a gold glove since Jim Kaat in 1973.

Season standings

Record vs. opponents

Notable transactions
 April 8, 1986: Houston Jiménez was released by the Twins.
 May 20, 1986: Keith Atherton was traded by the Oakland Athletics to the Minnesota Twins for a player to be named later and cash. The Minnesota Twins sent Eric Broersma (minors) (May 23, 1986) to the Oakland Athletics to complete the trade.
 June 2, 1986: Derek Parks was drafted by the Twins in the 1st round (10th pick) of the 1986 Major League Baseball draft.
 June 20, 1986: John Butcher was traded by the Twins to the Cleveland Indians for Neal Heaton.

Roster

Player stats

Batting

Starters by position
Note: Pos = Position; G = Games played; AB = At bats; H = Hits; Avg. = Batting average; HR = Home runs; RBI = Runs batted in

Other batters
Note: G = Games played; AB = At bats; H = Hits; Avg. = Batting average; HR = Home runs; RBI = Runs batted in

Pitching

Starting pitchers
Note: G = Games pitched; IP = Innings pitched; W = Wins; L = Losses; ERA = Earned run average; SO = Strikeouts

Other pitchers
Note: G = Games pitched; IP = Innings pitched; W = Wins; L = Losses; ERA = Earned run average; SO = Strikeouts

Relief pitchers
Note: G = Games pitched; W = Wins; L = Losses; SV = Saves; ERA = Earned run average; SO = Strikeouts

Farm system

Notes

References
Player stats from www.baseball-reference.com
Team info from www.baseball-almanac.com

Minnesota Twins seasons
Minnesota Twins season
Minnesota Twins